Noura Mana (born 12 December 1997) is a Moroccan swimmer. She competed in the women's 50 metre freestyle event at the 2016 Summer Olympics. In 2019, she represented Morocco at the 2019 African Games held in Rabat, Morocco. She competed in the women's 50 metre freestyle and women's 100 metre freestyle events.

References

External links
 

1997 births
Living people
Moroccan female swimmers
Olympic swimmers of Morocco
Swimmers at the 2016 Summer Olympics
Place of birth missing (living people)
Swimmers at the 2019 African Games
African Games medalists in swimming
African Games bronze medalists for Morocco
Moroccan female freestyle swimmers
21st-century Moroccan women